Claus Biederstaedt (28 June 1928 – 18 June 2020) was a German actor. He studied in Hamburg and began his career working with Joseph Offenbach. Among the actors for whom he dubbed were Yves Montand, Peter Falk, Marlon Brando, Vittorio Gassman, and James Garner.

Selected filmography

 The Great Temptation (1952) - Famulus Huber
 A Musical War of Love (1953) - Rautenkranz
 Arlette Conquers Paris (1953) - Student Marc Tissier
 I and You (1953) - Paul
 A Love Story (1954) - von Gagern, Regiments-Adjutant
 The Crazy Clinic (1954) - Evelyns Begleiter
 Die Sonne von St. Moritz (1954) - Paul Genzmer
 Sauerbruch – Das war mein Leben (1954) - Kommissar
 Fireworks (1954) - Gärtner Robert Busch
 Don't Worry About Your Mother-in-Law (1954) - Martin Hoffmann
 The Last Summer (1954) - Der Leutnant (uncredited)
 The Eternal Waltz (1954) - Gregor Alexevitch
 Music, Music and Only Music (1955) - Maurice
 Children, Mother, and the General (1955) - Gefreiter mit der Holzhand
 Stopover in Orly (1955) - Jim
 Three Men in the Snow (1955) - Dr. Fritz Hagedorn
 Heaven Is Never Booked Up (1955) - Franz
 My Children and I (1955) - Günther Hartmann
 A Girl Without Boundaries (1955) - Georg Hartmann
 Urlaub auf Ehrenwort (1956) - Lt. Walter Prätorius
 Charley's Aunt (1956) - Ralf Dernburg
 Before Sundown (1956) - Egbert Clausen
 Black Forest Melody (1956) - Hans Homann
 Kleines Zelt und große Liebe (1956) - Peter Brahm
 Was die Schwalbe sang (1956) - Gerhard Meyen
 Das Donkosakenlied (1956) - Rolf Bender
 Die Christel von der Post (1956) - Mecky Doppler
 Die verpfuschte Hochzeitsnacht (1957) - Peter Mayer
 Kindermädchen für Papa gesucht (1957) - Peter Jäger
  (1957) - Hannes Romberg
 Es wird alles wieder gut (1957) - Manager Peter Link
 The Legs of Dolores (1957) - Dr. Hans Lorenz
 Night Nurse Ingeborg (1958) - Dr. Manfred Burger
  (1958) - Viktor Kardoff
 Majestät auf Abwegen (1958) - Jochen Brinkmann
 Scala - total verrückt (1958) - Bob
 What a Woman Dreams of in Springtime (1959) - Fritz Bergstadt
 Tunis Top Secret (1959) - Mr. George
 Mandolins and Moonlight (1959)
 A Summer You Will Never Forget (1959) - Ernst Leuchtenthal
 Glück und Liebe in Monaco (1959) - Claus Hohberg, Reporter
 Do Not Send Your Wife to Italy (1960) - Robert Kiel
 Willy the Private Detective (1960) - Dr. Werner Meyer
 Schön ist die Liebe am Königssee (1961) - Ronald Twiss (voice, uncredited)
 What Is Father Doing in Italy? (1961) - Matthias Daniel
 Am Sonntag will mein Süsser mit mir segeln gehn (1961) - Paul, der Geschiedene
 Isola Bella (1961) - Hubert Bergmann
 Wenn die Musik spielt am Wörthersee (1962) - Hans Breuer
 The Post Has Gone (1962) - Harry Eberhardt
 Übermut im Salzkammergut (1963) - Rolf Simser
 ...denn die Musik und die Liebe in Tirol (1963) - Fred
 The World Revolves Around You (1964) - Peter Winters, Reporter
 Hotel der toten Gäste (1965) - Morton Marlowe
 Kommissar X – Drei gelbe Katzen (1966) - Baker (voice, uncredited)
 Mister Dynamit - Morgen küßt euch der Tod (1967) - Bardo Baretti (voice, uncredited)
 Unter den Dächern von St. Pauli (1970) - Dr. Pasucha (voice, uncredited)
 Tiger Gang (1971) - Supt. Ali (voice, uncredited)
 Aguirre, the Wrath of God (1972) - Brother Gaspar de Carvajal (voice, uncredited)
 Schwarzwaldfahrt aus Liebeskummer (1974) - Bernhard Klingenberg
 Auch ich war nur ein mittelmäßiger Schüler (1974) - Wolfgang Ahrens
 Derrick (1979-1982, TV Series) - Arnold Soske / Harald Linder / Answald Hohner / Dr. Homann
  (2011, TV Movie documentary) - Self

References

External links

 Biography with photo 
 

1928 births
2020 deaths
People from Stargard
People from the Province of Pomerania
German male television actors
German male voice actors
German male film actors
20th-century German male actors